Keshapali is a small census village in Jujumura Block of  Sambalpur district of Indian state, Odisha. It is administered under Keshapali Grampanchayat and comes under the Jujumura Tahsil  and it is a crucial booth of Rairakhol constituency. The small village had a population of 832 in 2011. Keshapali has two Aganwadi centers, a primary school, a high school, a primary hospital and also a primary animal hospital. Goverdhan Puja is the famous festival of the village.

Government Offices

 Keshapali Panchayat Office 
 Post Office Keshapali 
 Revenue Office Keshapali 
 Primary Hospital Keshapali 
 Primary Animal Asylum

Education

There are two Anganwadi Centers, namely Keshapali-A and Keshapali-B, where the children are taken care up-to 5 years old. A Primary School  is also in the village, where only three teaches are there for class 1 to 5. A Govt. High School  is also here. Hostel facility is also provided to girls belongs to SCs and STs category.

Gallery

References

Villages in Sambalpur district